The Highest Bidder is a lost 1921 American drama film directed by Wallace Worsley and written by Lloyd Lonergan. It is based on the 1920 novel The Trap by Maximilian Foster. The film stars Madge Kennedy, Lionel Atwill, Vernon Steele, Ellen Cassidy, Zelda Sears and Joseph Brennan. The film was released on January 15, 1921, by Goldwyn Pictures.

Cast         
Madge Kennedy as Sally Raeburn
Lionel Atwill as Lester
Vernon Steele as Hastings
Ellen Cassidy as Fanny de Witt 
Zelda Sears as Mrs. Steese
Joseph Brennan as Horace Ashe
Reginald Mason as Mawsby
Brian Darley as Butts
William Black as Mr. Steese

References

External links
 
The Highest Bidder at silentera.com

1921 films
American silent feature films
1920s English-language films
Lost American films
Silent American drama films
1921 drama films
Goldwyn Pictures films
Films directed by Wallace Worsley
American black-and-white films
Films based on American novels
1920s American films